Agnippe albidorsella is a moth of the family Gelechiidae. It is found in Russia (Primorsky Region, Amur Region, Chita Region), China (Gansu, Henan, Ningxia, Zhejiang), Korea and Japan.

The wingspan is 9–10.2 mm. The forewings have black basal and large black medial patches from the costa to the posterior margin. The hindwings are light grey. Adults are on wing from May to August. There are three or more generations per year in Japan.

The larvae feed on Lespedeza species.

References

Moths described in 1884
Agnippe
Moths of Asia